Of Entity and Mind is the first EP by the Norwegian neoclassical metal band Winds. It consists of an intro and 4 songs.

Track listing

 1 "Inception Perspective" (1:28)
 2 "In All Reflections" (4:19)
 3 "Bloodstained and Sworn" (5:46)
 4 "Mirrored in Time" (4:58)
 5 "An Eternity of Dreams" (4:43)

References

Winds (band) albums
2001 EPs
Avantgarde Music EPs